Aashirvad Cinemas is an Indian film production company based in Kochi, Kerala. It was established in 2000 by Antony Perumbavoor, since then, it has produced over 30 Malayalam films, starring Mohanlal. Since 2009, the company co-operates with the distribution company Maxlab Cinemas and Entertainments co-founded by Mohanlal and Antony Perumbavoor for distributing films. It is one among the most active and leading production houses in the Malayalam film industry.

Aashirvad Cinemas has established itself by producing several hits such as Narasimham (2000), Ravanaprabhu (2001), Naran (2005),Rasathanthram (2006), Drishyam (2013), Oppam (2016), and Lucifer (2019). It has also produced three of the most expensive Malayalam films — Odiyan (2018), Lucifer (2019), and Marakkar: Arabikadalinte Simham (2020) with Marakkar not being profitable ventures for the production house.

Aashirvad Cinemas has won several awards, including two National Film Awards, four Kerala State Film Awards and a Filmfare Awards South. In 2019, Aashirvad Cinemas opened office in Hong Kong with the name Feitian Aashirvad Cinemas and signed an agreement with a Chinese film production company to co-produce and distribute films in China. Aashirvad Cinemas is the currently the biggest production company in Mollywood. It has made big budget films like Odiyan (₹30 crore), Lucifer (₹35 crore) and Marakkar: Arabikadalinte Simham (₹100 crore).

History
Aashirvad Cinemas was founded by Mohanlal's former chauffeur Antony Perumbavoor in 2000. Its first production was the 2000 film, Narasimham. The company's next was the 2001 action drama film, Raavanaprabhu, which was a sequel to the 1993 film, Devasuram. The film won the Kerala State Film Award for Best Film with Popular Appeal and Aesthetic Value. Over the years, Aashrivad Cinemas have continued to receive great reception and success for their films and continue making new records.

The action drama Natturajavu was the only release in 2004. It released coinciding with the festival of Onam and was the winner among the Onam releases. Joshiy-directed action drama Naran was the only release in 2005, which was the winner among the Onam releases of the year. In the following year, Sathyan Anthikkad-directed family drama Rasathanthram became a commercial success. Two films released in 2009, action film Sagar Alias Jackie Reloaded directed by Amal Neerad, a spiritual successor to Mohanlal's 1987 film Irupatham Noottandu. It had a good opening which did not sustain in the following weeks.

The 2011 comedy film China Town made ₹15.2 crore at the box office and was a major commercial success. The 2012 drama Spirit won the National Film Award for Best Film on Other Social Issues. In 2013, family-thriller Drishyam received widespread critical acclaim and became the highest-grossing Malayalam and industry hit film and the first to gross over ₹50 crore mark at the box office. The 2016 crime thriller Oppam also became one of the highest-grossing Malayalam films of all time by grossing ₹65 crore worldwide.

Mohanlal and Lal Jose collaborated for the first time in Velipadinte Pusthakam in 2017, which was a moderate success. In 2019, Prithviraj Sukumaran-directed action drama Lucifer grossed ₹200 crore worldwide, becoming the highest-grossing Malayalam film till date, beating Mohanlal's Pulimurugan. It was also the first Malayalam film to gross over ₹50 crores in overseas markets. It was followed by the comedy-drama Ittymaani: Made in China directed by debutant duo Jibi-Joju. During the pandemic, Aashirvad Cinemas produced the sequel to Drishyam, Drishyam 2, which was the first film in Mohanlal's career to premiere on an OTT platform Amazon Prime Video instead of the normal theatrical release. The film received widespread positive reviews. Then the company produced Telugu film titled Drushyam 2 (co-produced by Suresh Productions and RajKumar Theatres), which was a remake of Drishyam 2 also premiered on OTT platform Amazon Prime Video instead of the theatrical release.  The company produced Marakkar: Arabikadalinte Simham (co-produced by Moonshot Entertainments and Confident Group), an action period film directed by Priyadarshan based on the life of Kunjali Marakkar. It is the most expensive Malayalam film ever, with a budget of ₹100 crores. The film released on 2 December 2021. In 2022, the company produced three films, out of which two films, Bro Daddy directed by Prithviraj Sukumaran and 12th Man directed by Jeethu Joseph had Direct OTT release on Disney+ Hotstar. Both films received generally positive reviews. Then they produced Monster directed by Vysakh and the film was Mohanlal's second collaboration with Vysakh (as director) after Pulimurugan. In 2023, the company produced Alone directed by Shaji Kailas. The film received mixed to positive reviews but was a Box-office failure mainly because the film was originally filmed for OTT. 

Aashirvad Cinemas' next project is Mohanlal's debut directorial Barroz: Guardian of D'Gama's Treasure, which completed shooting and ongoing with pre-production works. The project they will be doing afterwards will be the sequel to the 2019 film Lucifer called Empuraan.

Filmography

Accolades

Following are the accolades won by Aashirvad Cinemas. The awards received by the producer alone is included in this list.

See also 
 Pranavam Arts
 Maxlab Cinemas and Entertainments

References

External links
 Aashirvad Cineplexx Theatre

Mohanlal
Film production companies of Kerala
Indian companies established in 2000
2000 establishments in Kerala
Mass media companies established in 2000
Companies based in Kochi